"Everything in Its Right Place" is a song by the English rock band Radiohead, released on their fourth album, Kid A (2000). It features synthesiser, manipulated vocals, and lyrics inspired by the stress singer Thom Yorke experienced while promoting Radiohead's album OK Computer (1997).

Yorke wrote "Everything in Its Right Place" on piano. Radiohead worked on it in a conventional band arrangement before transferring it to synthesiser, and described it as a breakthrough in the album recording. Though it alienated some listeners expecting more of Radiohead's earlier rock music, "Everything in Its Right Place" was named one of the best songs of the decade by several publications.

Writing 
Following the success of Radiohead's 1997 album OK Computer, the songwriter Thom Yorke had a mental breakdown. He suffered from writer's block and became disillusioned with rock music. Instead, he listened almost exclusively to the electronic music of Warp artists such as Aphex Twin and Autechre, saying: "It was refreshing because the music was all structures and had no human voices in it. But I felt just as emotional about it as I'd ever felt about guitar music."

Yorke bought a house in Cornwall and spent his time walking the cliffs and drawing, restricting his musical activity to playing his new grand piano. "Everything in Its Right Place" was the first song he wrote, followed by "Pyramid Song". Yorke described himself as a "shit piano player", and took inspiration from a quote by Tom Waits saying that ignorance of instruments gives him inspiration. Yorke said: "That's one of the reasons I wanted to get into computers and synths, because I didn't understand how the fuck they worked. I had no idea what ADSR meant." He would "endlessly" play the riff for "Everything in its Right Place", attempting to "meditate out of" his depression.

Yorke denied that the lyrics were "gibberish", and said they expressed the depression he experienced on the OK Computer tour. He cited a performance at the NEC Arena in Birmingham, England, in 1997: "I came off at the end of that show sat in the dressing room and couldn't speak ... People were saying, 'You all right?' I knew people were speaking to me. But I couldn't hear them ... I'd just so had enough. And I was bored with saying I'd had enough." The line "Yesterday I woke up sucking a lemon" references the sour-faced expression Yorke said he wore "for three years". Yorke said the line was "pretty silly ... But I thought it was funny when I sang it. When I listened to it afterwards, it meant something else.”

Recording 

According to the Radiohead bassist, Colin Greenwood, Radiohead's producer Nigel Godrich was initially unimpressed by "Everything in its Right Place". Radiohead worked on the song in a conventional band arrangement in Copenhagen and Paris, but without results. One night, while they were working in Gloucestershire, Yorke and Godrich transferred the song from piano to a Prophet-5 synthesiser. Yorke hesitated to use the line "Yesterday I woke up sucking a lemon", but recorded it at Godrich's encouragement. Godrich processed his vocals in Pro Tools using a scrubbing tool. For live performances, Radiohead recreated the vocal effect by manipulating Yorke's vocals with Kaoss Pads.

The lead guitarist, Jonny Greenwood, said the song was a turning point in the making of Kid A: "We knew it had to be the first song, and everything just followed after it." He said it was the first time Radiohead had been happy to leave a song "sparse", instead of "layering on top of what's a very good song or a very good sound, and hiding it, camouflaging it in case it's not good enough". The guitarist Ed O'Brien and the drummer, Philip Selway, said the track forced them to accept that not every song needed every band member to play on it. O'Brien recalled: "It forced the issue, immediately! And to be genuinely sort of delighted that you'd been working for six months on this record and something great has come out of it, and you haven't contributed to it, is a really liberating feeling."

Composition
"Everything in its Right Place" is an electronic song featuring synthesiser and digitally manipulated vocals. ABC.net described it as "dissonant" and "ominous". According to NME, it features "Warp-style electronica, minimalism and all manner of glitchy creepiness", with a "weirdly hymnal dreamscape of ambient keys". O'Brien observed that it lacked the crescendos typical of Radiohead's previous songs.

The minimalist composer Steve Reich, who reinterpreted "Everything in Its Right Place" for his 2014 album Radio Rewrite noted the song's unusual harmonic movement, observing that "it was originally in F minor, and it never comes down to the one chord, the F minor chord is never stated. So there's never a tonic, there's never a cadence in the normal sense." He also noted that the word "everything" follows the dominant and tonic: "The tonic and the dominant are the end of every Beethoven symphony, the end of everything in classical music ... I'm sure Thom did it intuitively, I'm sure he wasn't thinking about it ... but it's perfect, it is everything."

Reception 
"Everything in Its Right Place" alienated critics who had hoped for more of the rock music of Radiohead's previous albums. The NME described it as "the moment where Radiohead finally left behind the limitations of being an alt rock band and embraced a whole wide world of weirdness". In 2009, Pitchfork described the shock some fans experienced hearing it for the first time:

Reviewing Kid A, the Guardian critic Alexis Petridis called "Everything in Its Right Place" a "messy and inconsequential doodle", and the Melody Maker critic Mark Beaumont dismissed it as a "haphazard and pointless synth'n'laptop experiment". Reviewing Kid A for the New Yorker, Nick Hornby described his disappointment in the song: "'Hey! I can handle experimentalism!' you think, but your confidence is immediately knocked flat by the lyrics." NME described it as a "beautiful triumph of understatement" and a "pointed" opener. 

"Everything In Its Right Place" was named one of the best tracks of the decade by Rolling Stone, NME and Pitchfork. In a 2020 piece for the Guardian, the journalist Jazz Monroe named it the 25th-best Radiohead track, writing: "Like David Byrne before him, Yorke had renounced his authorship to flirt with self-erasure, yielding to gorgeously sunlit synths."

Personnel

Radiohead
Colin Greenwood 
Jonny Greenwood 
Ed O'Brien 
Philip Selway
Thom Yorke

Additional personnel
 Nigel Godrich production, engineering, mixing
 Gerard Navarro production assistance, additional engineering
 Graeme Stewart additional engineering

Certifications

References

'

Radiohead songs
2000 songs
Song recordings produced by Nigel Godrich
Songs written by Thom Yorke
Songs written by Colin Greenwood
Songs written by Jonny Greenwood
Songs written by Philip Selway
Songs written by Ed O'Brien
Songs about depression
Post-rock songs